Faculty of Chemical Technology is the name of a department at several universities:

 University of Chemical Technology and Metallurgy, Bulgaria
 University of Chemistry and Technology, Prague, Czech Republic
 University of Pardubice, Czech Republic
 Georgian Technical University, Tbilisi, Georgia
 Kaunas University of Technology, Lithuania
 Poznań University of Technology, Poland
 Hanoi University of Industry, Vietnam

See also
 Faculty of Chemical Technology and Biotechnology, Budapest University of Technology and Economics, Hungary
 Faculty of Chemical Technologies and Environmental Engineering, National Polytechnic University of Armenia